Ponvizha is a 1999 Indian Tamil-language drama film directed by Ashokan, who had previously directed the film Thamizhachi (1995). The film stars Napoleon and Suvalakshmi. It was released on 6 August 1999.

Plot

Ponni  lives with her grandmother and they are set aside by the villagers. Bharathi, a jobless man, landed in Ponni's village. Manivanan was village chief(gounder).

In the past, Ponni was the village and she was going to marry. Before the marriage, the villagers including her father and Velusamy met an accident and many villagers lost their lives in the accident. Since that day, the villagers began to hate Ponni. Bharathi was, in fact, the lorry driver who perpetrated the accident but nobody knows about it.

Bharathi felt guilty for the accident and he is now on a quest for redemption so he wants to help Ponni.

Cast

Napoleon as Bharathi
Suvalakshmi as Ponni
Manivannan as Vettuva Gounder
Ranjith as Velusamy
Swathi as Parvathi
Senthil 
Balu Anand
Crane Manohar
S. N. Lakshmi as Ponni's grandmother
Sukumari
Visu as a district collector (guest appearance)

Soundtrack

The film score and the soundtrack were composed by Deva.

References

1999 films
1990s Tamil-language films
Indian drama films
Films scored by Deva (composer)